Edward Santree Brophy (February 27, 1895 – May 27, 1960) was an American character actor and comedian, as well as an assistant director and second unit director during the 1920s. Small of build, balding, and raucous-voiced, he frequently portrayed dumb cops and gangsters, both serious and comic. 

He is best remembered as the sidekick to The Falcon in the Tom Conway film series of the 1940s, and for voicing Timothy Q. Mouse in Walt Disney's Dumbo (1941).

Early life
Edward Santree Brophy was born on February 27, 1895, in New York City and attended the University of Virginia.

Career
His screen debut was in Yes or No? (1920). In 1928, with only a few minor film roles to his credit, Brophy was working as a production manager for Metro-Goldwyn-Mayer when he was on location with Buster Keaton for the feature film The Cameraman. An actor failed to show up, and rather than having to wait for the studio to send a substitute, Keaton recruited Brophy on the spot to take the actor's place. As two occupants of a bath-house, Brophy and Keaton attempt to undress and put on bathing suits while sharing a single tiny changing room. Each time Keaton attempts to hang his clothes on one hook, Brophy removes the clothes and hands them back to Keaton and gestures to the other hook. He manhandles the smaller, more slender Keaton, at one point picking him up by the feet and dumping him out of his trousers. Appearing only in this one brief scene, Brophy attracted enough attention to receive more and better roles.

Keaton used Brophy again in his military comedy Doughboys (1930), with Brophy as a loud-mouthed drill sergeant. This defined Brophy's screen persona as a Brooklyn-accented, streetwise character. His subsequent films for MGM cast him in the same vein: comic foils in four more Keaton features; the loyal fight manager in The Champ (1931); a circus proprietor in Freaks (1932 film) (1932); and as a hired gun in The Thin Man (1934).

By 1940 Brophy was so identified as a Runyonesque character with a Brooklynese speech pattern that he was cast as the voice of Timothy Q. Mouse in Dumbo, even though he was uncredited for this role. Brophy worked steadily through the 1950s, in both featured roles and uncredited bits, almost always in light film fare. Very rarely was he called upon to display dramatic ability, as in the police procedural Arson, Inc. (1949), in which he played a potentially dangerous firebug. He also made several appearances in the films of director John Ford, notably as "Ditto" Boland in The Last Hurrah (1958), Brophy's last film.

Brophy was the model for comic-book character Doiby Dickles, the cab-driving sidekick to Green Lantern in the 1940s.

Death
Brophy died on May 27, 1960, during the production of Ford's Two Rode Together. (One source says Brophy "died while watching a prizefight on television.") He was 65. He was buried in Santa Monica's Woodlawn Cemetery next to his wife Ann S. Brophy. (Another source listed "widow, Ann" as a survivor.)

Filmography

 Yes or No? (1920) as Tom Martin
 The Sign on the Door (1921) as Newspaper Photographer (uncredited)
 Spring Fever (1927) as Golf Game Spectator (uncredited)
 West Point (1927) as Team Manager (uncredited)
 The Cameraman (1928) as Man in Bath-House (uncredited)
 Free and Easy (1930) as Benny - The Stage Manager (uncredited)
 Estrellados (1930) as Assistant Director (uncredited)
 Our Blushing Brides (1930) as Joe Munsey
 Doughboys (1930) as Sergeant Brophy
 Those Three French Girls (1930) as Yank
 Remote Control (1930) as Al
 Paid (1930) as Burglar (uncredited)
 Parlor, Bedroom and Bath (1931) as Detective
 A Free Soul (1931) as Slouch (uncredited)
 Sporting Blood (1931) as Newsreel Cameraman (uncredited)
 A Dangerous Affair (1931) as Nelson
 The Champ (1931) as Tim
 The Big Shot (1931) as Minor Role (scenes deleted)
 The Passionate Plumber (1932) as Man Outside Beauty Parlor (uncredited)
 Freaks (1932) as Rollo Brother
 The Beast of the City (1932) as Police Dispatcher (uncredited)
 Skyscraper Souls (1932) as Man in Elevator (uncredited)
 Speak Easily (1932) as Reno
 Prosperity (1932) as Ice Cream Salesman (uncredited)
 Flesh (1932) as Dolan - a Referee
 What! No Beer? (1933) as Spike Moran
 Beer and Pretzels (1933, Short) as Theater Manager (uncredited)
 Broadway to Hollywood (1933) as Joe Mannion (uncredited)
 Hello Pop! (1933, Short) as Brophy (uncredited)
 The Poor Rich (1934) as Flannigan
 The Thin Man (1934) as Morelli
 Paris Interlude (1934) as Ham
 Hide-Out (1934) as Detective Britt
 Have a Heart (1934) as Mac (uncredited)
 Death on the Diamond (1934) as Grogan
 Evelyn Prentice (1934) as Eddie Delaney
 I'll Fix It (1934) as Tilly Tilson
 Sequoia (1934) as Forest Ranger Pete (uncredited)
 Forsaking All Others (1934) (scenes deleted)
 Devil Dogs of the Air (1935) as Minor Role (scenes deleted)
 Shadow of Doubt (1935) as Fred Wilcox
 The Whole Town's Talking (1935) as 'Slugs' Martin
 Naughty Marietta (1935) as Zeke
 People Will Talk (1935) as Pete Ranse
 Mad Love (1935) as Rollo
 She Gets Her Man (1935) as Flash
 China Seas (1935) as Wilbur Timmons
 I Live My Life (1935) as Pete (uncredited)
 1,000 Dollars a Minute (1935) as Benny Dolan
 Remember Last Night? (1935) as Maxie
 Show Them No Mercy! (1935) as Buzz
 Strike Me Pink (1936) as Killer
 Here Comes Trouble (1936) as Crowley
 Woman Trap (1936) as George Meade
 The Case Against Mrs. Ames (1936) as Sid
 Kelly the Second (1936) as Ike Arnold
 Spendthrift (1936) as Bill McGuire
 Wedding Present (1936) as Squinty
 All American Chump (1936) as Pudgy Murphy
 Mr. Cinderella (1936) as Detective McNutt
 Hideaway Girl (1936) as Bugs Murphy
 Career Woman (1936) as Doc Curley
 Great Guy (1936) as Pete Reilly
 Oh, Doctor (1937) as Meg Smith
 Jim Hanvey, Detective (1937) as Romo
 The Soldier and the Lady (1937) as Packer
 The Hit Parade (1937) as Mulrooney
 The Great Gambini (1937) as 'Butch'
 Varsity Show (1937) as Mike Barclay
 Trapped by G-Men (1937) as Lefty
 The Girl Said No (1937) as Pick
 The Last Gangster (1937) as 'Fats' Garvey
 Blossoms on Broadway (1937) as Mr. Prussic
 A Slight Case of Murder (1938) as Lefty
 Romance on the Run (1938) as Whitey Whitehouse
 Hold That Kiss (1938) as Al
 Gold Diggers in Paris (1938) as Mike Coogan
 Passport Husband (1938) as Spike
 Come On, Leathernecks! (1938) as Max 'Curly' Maxwell
 Vacation from Love (1938) as Barney Keenan, Band Leader
 Gambling Ship (1938) as Cuthbert Innocent
 You Can't Cheat an Honest Man (1939) as Corbett
 Pardon Our Nerve (1939) as Nosey Nelson
 Society Lawyer (1939) as Max
 For Love or Money (1939) as Sleeper
 The Kid from Kokomo (1939) as Eddie Black
 Golden Boy (1939) as Roxy Lewis
 Mr. Smith Goes to Washington (1939) as Newspaper employee (uncredited)
 Kid Nightingale (1939) as Mike Jordon
 The Amazing Mr. Williams (1939) as Buck Moseby
 The Big Guy (1939) as Dippy
 Calling Philo Vance (1940) as Ryan
 Alias the Deacon (1940) as Stuffy
 Golden Gloves (1940) as Potsy Brill
 The Great Profile (1940) as Sylvester
 Dance, Girl, Dance (1940) as Dwarfie Humblewinger
 Sandy Gets Her Man (1940) as Fireman Junior
 The Invisible Woman (1940) as Bill
 Sleepers West (1941) as George Trautwein
 Thieves Fall Out (1941) as Rork
 The Bride Came C.O.D. (1941) as Hinkle
 A Dangerous Game (1941) as Bugsy (misspelled Bugs in on-screen credits)
 Nine Lives Are Not Enough (1941) as Officer Slattery
 Buy Me That Town (1941) as Ziggy
 Dumbo (1941) as Timothy Q. Mouse (voice, uncredited)
 The Gay Falcon (1941) as Detective Bates
 Steel Against the Sky (1941) as Pete Evans
 All Through the Night (1942) as Joe Denning
 Broadway (1942) as Porky
 Larceny, Inc. (1942) as Weepy Davis
 Madame Spy (1942) as Mike Reese
 Lady Bodyguard (1943) as Harry Gargan
 Air Force (1943) as Marine Sgt. J.J. Callahan
 Destroyer (1943) as Casey
 A Scream in the Dark (1943) as Eddie Tough
 Cover Girl (1944) as Joe - Cafe Owner (uncredited)
 It Happened Tomorrow (1944) as Jake Shomberg
 A Night of Adventure (1944) as Steve
 The Thin Man Goes Home (1944) as Brogan
 See My Lawyer (1945) as Otis Fillmore
 I'll Remember April (1945) as Shadow
 Wonder Man (1945) as Torso
 Penthouse Rhythm (1945) as Bailey
 The Falcon in San Francisco (1945) as Goldie Locke
 Girl on the Spot (1946) as Fingers Foley
 Swing Parade of 1946 (1946) as Moose
 Sweetheart of Sigma Chi (1946) as Arty
 The Falcon's Adventure (1946) as Goldie Locke
 Renegade Girl (1946) as Bob Crandall
 It Happened on 5th Avenue (1947) as Cecil Felton
 Arson, Inc. (1949) as Pete Purdy
 Danger Zone (1951) as Prof. Frederick Simpson Schicker
 Roaring City (1951) as 'Professor' Frederick Simpson Schicker
 Pier 23 (1951) as Prof. Shicker
 Bundle of Joy (1956) as Dance Contest Judge
 The Last Hurrah (1958) as 'Ditto' Boland
 The Slowest Gun in the West (1960, TV Movie) as The Bartender
Two Rode Together (1961) as Minor Role (uncredited) (final film role)

References

External links

Edward Brophy at Turner Classic Movies

1920 passport photo for Edward Brophy

1895 births
1960 deaths
University of Virginia alumni
Male actors from New York City
American male film actors
American male voice actors
20th-century American male actors
Burials at Woodlawn Memorial Cemetery, Santa Monica
Metro-Goldwyn-Mayer contract players